Mahmut Tekdemir (born 20 January 1988) is a Turkish professional footballer who currently plays as a defensive midfielder for İstanbul Başakşehir

Club career
Tekdemir holds İstanbul Başakşehir's all-time appearances record with 428 overall appearances as of 26 September 2021.

International career
Tekdemir is a youth and A2 international. He got his first callup in a friendly 2-1 win over Luxembourg.

Statistics

Club

International
:

Honours
İstanbul Büyükşehir Belediyespor
TFF First League (1): 2013–14

İstanbul Başakşehir F.K.
Süper Lig (1): 2019–20

References

External links

  
 

1988 births
Living people
Turkish footballers
Turkey under-21 international footballers
Turkey B international footballers
İstanbul Başakşehir F.K. players
Süper Lig players
TFF First League players
Turkey international footballers
People from Çermik
Association football defenders